Spiritual State is the third and final studio album by Nujabes, released posthumously as a follow-up to Modal Soul in 2005. The album was incomplete upon Nujabes' death in February 2010, inspiring those close to him to see it finished. Spiritual State was released in Japan on December 3, 2011 and February 2012 in the United States.

Reviewing the album, The Word is Bond called it "the perfect follow up to Nujabes' previous projects" and "a gem".

Track listing

References 

Albums produced by Nujabes
Nujabes albums
2011 albums
Instrumental hip hop albums
Albums published posthumously